Farzad Motamen (born 9 August 1957), is an Iranian film director.

Early life and background 
Farzad Mo'temman spent his childhood and teenage in south of Iran and, after graduating from high school, went to the United States to study. In 1979, he left school in the field of cinema and returned to Iran. After that, Motemn was active in photography, filming, and documenting. He has also been teaching at Sooreh University and Pars University since 1999 besides making films.

Filmography

References

External links

Academic staff of Soore University
1957 births
Living people
Iranian film directors